Yaacov Zilberman (born 26 May 1954) is an Israeli chess grandmaster.

He played for Israel on the second reserve board in the 30th Chess Olympiad at Manila 1992.

He shared first place with Robert Hübner and Iván Morovic Fernández at Havana 1998 (Capablanca Memorial, Elite). He was awarded the Grandmaster title in 1998.

He competed at the 2017 Maccabiah Games.

Three times he played in the European Chess Club Cup, in 1992 with Hapoel Tel Aviv (reaching the semifinals), in 1997 and in 2001 with Herzliya Chess Club.

References

External links
Yaacov Zilberman

1954 births
Living people
Israeli Jews
Chess grandmasters
Israeli chess players
Jewish chess players
Competitors at the 2017 Maccabiah Games
Maccabiah Games chess players
Maccabiah Games competitors for Israel